Alaattin  is a town in Acıpayam district of Denizli Province, Turkey. The population of Alaattin was 2298  as of 2012. The settlement was named after Alaattin  a Turkmen tribe leader who founded the settlement in 15th century. In 1969 it was declared a seat of township. Agriculture is the main economic activity. Chromium mines which were active in 1950s are no more active. Some town residents work in European countries as guest workers.

References

Towns in Turkey
Villages in Acıpayam District